Shotoronji(শতরঞ্জি) is a traditional handicrafts of the  Rangpur region of Bangladesh. It has recently been declared as a Geographical Indication Product of Bangladesh. It is  basically a carpet used both as a fashion element and carpet to prevent the bitter cold of its original  region. It is used as a carpet or artistic work. Shotoronji is considered as a symbol of aristrocracy in the northern region of Bangladesh. Currently it is one of the most popular exported handicraft products of Bangladesh as Bangladesh exports it to over 50 countries.

History 
Its history dates back to the Middle Ages, popularly referred to as a product from the Mughal ages. The techniques are so unique that they are being passed over by generations after generation of the same weaver families. They, however, can not make any exact claim regarding how old this tradition is. In 1830s, Ms. Nisbet, a British civil servant and the then Collector of Rangpur, visited the village of Peerpur near the city of Rangpur. He incidentally discover the villages of the weavers of Shotoronji. He was so impressed by the  product that he took government actions to promote this handicraft. On his honor still that part of the city is called Nishbetgunj. During the British rule, this product became popular in all over the Indian subcontinent and found its popular exporting destinations in Sri Lanka, Burma, Indonesia, Thailand and Malaysia. After the Partition of India, this products started losing its popularity and it  nearly became extinct. But for the last few decade it saw a significant rise because of its industrial production, marketing and exporting by the Karupanya Limited.

Weaving style 
The process is completely tradition and no modern technology is used. The main component is fabric. Ropes made out of fibers are woven in some geometrical measurements by bare hands. During this process ropes of different colours and different techniques are used for bringing different kind of designs inside it. Designs represents the weaver's own artwork and the local tradition of the north.

References

Bangladeshi culture
Floors
Bangladeshi handicrafts
Folk art
Bengali culture 
Arts in Bangladesh
Bangladeshi art